Callionymus marquesensis, the Marquesas ruddertail dragonet, is a species of dragonet native to the Pacific Ocean around the Marquesan Islands.  This species grows to a length of  SL.

References 

M
Fish described in 1983
Taxa named by Ronald Fricke